Jonathan Kennard (born 26 June 1985 in Tunbridge Wells, England) is a British Professional racing driver. He has won 2 series titles, Formula Palmer Audi in 2004 and the FPA Winter Trophy the previous year in 2003. 

He was also a test driver for the WilliamsF1 team in 2009.

He is race winner in both the National class (2005) and Championship class (2007) of British Formula Three. He also ran at the Zolder F3 Masters in 2007 and the Macau Grand Prix in 2007.

In 2009 he raced in the Superleague Formula for A.S. Roma in the 2009 season. He returned to the series driving for CR Flamengo at the Monza round of the series while Enrique Bernoldi was on FIA GT duty.

In 2010 he raced in the Le Mans Series for the Kruse Schiller Motorsport Team in the LMP2 Class using a Lola Judd. He also finished the Le Mans 24hrs on his first attempt with the same team.

He was the FIA Formula Two Test Driver from 2010 to 2012.

From 2016 to present, he races in Historic Formula One and Endurance Racing Legends in Le Mans Prototypes. Most recently in 2019, he secured pole position for the Silverstone Classic in a Pescarolo LMP1 and dominated the race weekend taking two wins.

In 2020 he raced in the Le Mans 24hrs in the LMP2 Class driving an Oreca 07 for IDEC Sport, finishing 11th in class and 15th overall.

Motorsports Career results

Career summary

† – Team standings.

Superleague Formula
(Races in bold indicate pole position) (Races in italics indicate fastest lap)

2009 Super Final results
Super Final results in 2009 did not count for points towards the main championship.

Complete 24 Hours of Le Mans results

Complete GT1 World Championship results

References

External links
 Official website
 Driver Database information
 Q&A with Jonathan Kennard

English racing drivers
1985 births
Living people
Superleague Formula drivers
International Formula Master drivers
British Formula Three Championship drivers
Formula Palmer Audi drivers
British Formula Renault 2.0 drivers
European Le Mans Series drivers
FIA GT1 World Championship drivers
24 Hours of Le Mans drivers
Alan Docking Racing drivers
Double R Racing drivers
Manor Motorsport drivers